Tibor Szele (Debrecen, 21 June 1918 – Szeged, 5 April 1955) Hungarian mathematician, working in combinatorics and abstract algebra. After graduating at the Debrecen University, he became a researcher at the Szeged University in 1946, then he went back at the Debrecen University in 1948 where he became full professor in 1952. He worked especially in the theory of Abelian groups and ring theory. He generalized Hajós's theorem. He founded the Hungarian school of algebra. Tibor Szele received the Kossuth Prize in 1952.

References
A panorama of Hungarian Mathematics in the Twentieth Century, p. 601.

External links
 Grave of Tibor Szele
 

Algebraists
Combinatorialists
Probability theorists
1918 births
1955 deaths
University of Debrecen alumni
Academic staff of the University of Debrecen
20th-century Hungarian mathematicians